Mozart: The Conspirators of Prague is a 2009 point-and-click puzzle adventure video game developed by GameCO Studios (Game Consulting Studios) and published by Micro Application for Microsoft Windows.

Development 
The game was announced on March 1, 2007. The game's website went live on March 13, featuring concept art, screenshots, a trailer, wallpapers, and other game information.

Plot 
The game concerns the life of Wolfgang Amadeus Mozart circa 1788, in which he is depicted as a Freemason. While in Prague preparing for the debut of his new opera Don Giovanni, he stumbles upon a plot to overthrow Joseph II, Holy Roman Emperor.

Gameplay 
The game is a point-and-click adventure played from the third-person perspective, and includes both musical puzzles and mechanical puzzles, as well as minigames such as a cards game and a conducting game.

Reception 
Prior to its release, Adventure's Planet deemed the project "promising". Igromania praised the game for its aesthetic, taste, and style. JeuxVideoPC felt some of the logical leaps required to complete puzzles would annoy gamers, but commented that the game effectively immerses the player into the world. Adventure Treff identified issues with hotspot-clicking and room navigation.

References

External links 
 Main page
 JeuxVideo preview
 MicroApp preview
 Concept art

2009 video games
Point-and-click adventure games
Wolfgang Amadeus Mozart in fiction
Video games developed in France
Video games set in the 18th century
Video games set in the Czech Republic
Windows games
Windows-only games
Video games based on real people
Cultural depictions of Wolfgang Amadeus Mozart
Cultural depictions of Joseph II, Holy Roman Emperor